Xylaria mali is a plant pathogen that causes black rot on apple.

References

Fungal tree pathogens and diseases
Apple tree diseases
Xylariales
Fungi described in 1928